NGC 3301, also known as NGC 3760, is a lenticular galaxy in the constellation Leo. Its apparent magnitude in the V-band is 11.1. It was first observed on March 12, 1784 by the astronomer William Herschel. It is a member of the Leo II Groups, a series of galaxies and galaxy clusters strung out from the right edge of the Virgo Supercluster.

References

External links 
 

3301
Lenticular galaxies
Leo (constellation)
031497